On Top (Icelandic: Með allt á hreinu) is an Icelandic musical comedy from 1982, directed by Icelandic director Ágúst Guðmundsson. The film, which still enjoys widespread popularity in Iceland, tells the story of two bands (one all-male and one all-female) that go on a tour together and then become engaged in a rivalry.

The cast is composed members of the pop bands Stuðmenn (also the name of the band in the film) and Grýlurnar (Gærurnar in the film), and the film is largely based on performances by the two bands. According to Valgeir Guðjónsson the L.A. Times film critic reviewed the movie and started the review by saying "On Top features a bunch of Icelandic fruitcakes wearing strange clothes"

Cast
Egill Ólafsson
Ragnhildur Gísladóttir
Valgeir Guðjónsson
Eggert Þorleifsson
Jakob Frímann Magnússon
Anna Björnsdóttir

Reception
The film was the highest-grossing film in Iceland in 1983.

References

External links

 

1982 films
Films directed by Ágúst Guðmundsson
Icelandic comedy films
1980s Icelandic-language films
1980s musical comedy films
1982 comedy films